Crawford High School may refer to:

 Will C. Crawford High School in San Diego, California, and latterly Crawford Educational Complex 
 Crawford Educational Complex in San Diego, California, and formerly Will C. Crawford High School
 Crawford High School (Colorado) in Crawford, Colorado, closed in 1962 when the district consolidated with Delta County and students were split between Paonia and Hotchkiss
 Crawford County High School (Georgia) in Roberta, Georgia
 Crawford County High School (Indiana) in Marengo, Indiana, and also known as Crawford County Junior-Senior High School 
 Crawford High School (Arcadia, Louisiana), listed on the National Register of Historic Places
 Crawford High School (Nebraska) in Crawford, Nebraska
 Colonel Crawford High School in North Robinson, Ohio
 Crawford High School (Texas) 
 Crawford High School, in Crawford, Texas
 Almeta Crawford High School in Fort Bend County, Texas, a school under construction.
 North Crawford High School in Crawford County, Wisconsin
 Crawford Colleges in South Africa
Crawford College, Pretoria
Crawford College, Lonehill
Crawford College, North Coast
Crawford College, Sandton
Crawford College, Durban
Crawford College, La Lucia